Roger Federer defeated Andy Roddick in the final, 6–3, 7–5 to win the men's singles tennis title at the 2005 Cincinnati Masters.

Andre Agassi was the reigning champion, but did not compete this year.

This was the first Masters tournament to feature future world No. 1's Novak Djokovic and Andy Murray; they lost in the first and second rounds, respectively.

Seeds 

  Roger Federer (champion)
  Rafael Nadal (first round)
  Lleyton Hewitt (semifinals)
  Marat Safin (quarterfinals)
  Andy Roddick (final)
  Nikolay Davydenko (quarterfinals)
  Andre Agassi (withdrew due to a back injury)
  Gastón Gaudio (first round)
  Guillermo Coria (second round)
  Mariano Puerta (first round)
  David Nalbandian (second round)
  Tim Henman (second round)
  Thomas Johansson (first round)
  Ivan Ljubičić (first round)
  Radek Štěpánek (first round)
  Richard Gasquet (second round)

Draw

Finals

Top half

Section 1

Section 2

Bottom half

Section 3

Section 4

References 
 2005 Main Draw
 2005 Qualifying Draw

Singles